Monica Bertagnolli (born 1959) is an American surgical oncologist and the 16th director of the National Cancer Institute. Previously, she worked at Brigham and Women's Hospital and Dana–Farber Cancer Institute and was the Richard E. Wilson Professor of Surgery at Harvard Medical School. She has advocated for inclusion of rural communities in clinical studies and served as Chair of the Alliance for Clinical Trials in Oncology until her appointment to lead NCI. Bertagnolli specializes in the treatment of tumors from gastrointestinal diseases and soft tissue sarcomas. She is the former President of the American Society of Clinical Oncology and was elected Fellow of the National Academy of Medicine in 2021.

Early life and education 
Bertagnolli grew up on a cattle ranch in Wyoming. Her parents were first generation French Basque and Italian immigrants. She earned a BSE in biochemical engineering from Princeton University. She studied medicine at the University of Utah School of Medicine and did her surgical residency at Brigham and Women's Hospital. She became board certified in 1993.

Research and career 
In 1994, Bertagnolli began as an associate surgeon at the Strang Cancer Prevention Center and attending surgeon at NewYork-Presbyterian Hospital–Cornell. She joined the faculty at Harvard Medical School in 1999 and was appointed at Dana–Farber Cancer Institute in 2000. Bertagnolli specializes in the treatment of tumors from gastrointestinal diseases and is an expert in treating soft-tissue sarcoma. She became the Chief of Surgical Oncology at the Dana-Farber Cancer Institute in 2007, and was the first woman to hold such a position. Bertagnolli's laboratory at the Dana-Farber / Harvard Cancer Center studies the role of Adenomatous polyposis coli (APC) mutations in colorectal carcinogenesis through animal studies and human clinical trials.

Awards and honors 
Her honors and awards include:
 2011 Partners Healthcare Partners in Excellence Award
 2015 Cancer Charles H. Sanders Life Sciences Award
 2018 Appointed President of the American Society of Clinical Oncology
 2021 Elected to the National Academy of Medicine
 2021 Appointed to the Board of Directors of American Cancer Society

Selected publications 
Her publications include:
 Molecular origins of cancer: Molecular basis of colorectal cancer
 Cardiovascular risk associated with celecoxib in a clinical trial for colorectal adenoma prevention
 Dissecting the multicellular ecosystem of metastatic melanoma by single-cell RNA-seq

Personal life 
Bertagnolli is married with two sons. After a routine mammogram, Bertagnolli received an early-stage breast cancer diagnosis in November 2022.

References 

Women oncologists
American surgeons
Harvard Medical School faculty
American Cancer Society people
Living people
1959 births
Members of the National Academy of Medicine
Princeton University alumni
University of Utah School of Medicine alumni
21st-century American women physicians
21st-century American physicians
American oncologists
National Institutes of Health people
Physician-scientists
American medical researchers
Women medical researchers
Cancer researchers
Women surgeons
American people of French descent
American people of Italian descent
Physicians from Wyoming
Biden administration personnel
American people of Basque descent